Géraldine Nakache (born 16 February 1980) is a French actress, director and screenwriter of Algerian Jewish descent.

Life and career
Nakache grew up in an Algerian Jewish family. She earned a DEUG diploma in cinema. She worked as assistant casting director in Groland on Canal + and as assistant director for Les Guignols de l'info and eventually executive producer on Comédie+. She has also appeared in a string of films and television series and directed Tout ce qui brille (2010) for which she won a number of awards and Nous York (2012).

She was married to actor and comedian Manu Payet in 2009. They divorced in 2011. Olivier Nakache, her brother, is a film director best known for directing the film Intouchables.

Filmography

As actress

As filmmaker

Theatre
2011: L’Amour, la mort, les fringues by Nora and Delia Ephron, directed by Danièle Thompson (Théâtre Marigny)

Discography

Singles
{| class="wikitable"
!align="center" rowspan="2" width="10"|Year
!align="center" rowspan="2" width="150"|Single
!align="center" colspan="1"|Peak positions
!align="center" rowspan="2" width="200"|Notes
|-
!width="20"|FR
|-
|align="center" rowspan="1"|2010
|"Chanson sur une drôle de vie" (Géraldine Nakache & Leïla Bekhti)
|align="center"|6
|align="center" rowspan="1"|From soundtrack of film Tout ce qui brille. A remake of a Véronique Sanson hit.
|-
|}

Awards and nominationsTout ce qui brille co-directed by Géraldine Nakache and Hervé Mimran won a number of awards including Jury Awards and the Public Award at the Festival international du film de comédie de l'Alpe d'Huez. She also won the Gold Trophy for Best Female Revelation, all in 2010.

In 2011, she was awarded the Golden Star of French Cinema Award for her debut film Tout ce qui brille''

References

External links

1980 births
20th-century French Sephardi Jews
21st-century French Sephardi Jews
21st-century French actresses
Living people
People from Suresnes
French film directors
Algerian Jews
Jewish French actresses
French film actresses
French television actresses
French women film directors
French women screenwriters
French screenwriters